Ghiasabad-e Bala may refer to:
 Ghiasabad-e Bala, Isfahan
 Ghiasabad-e Bala, Razavi Khorasan